Kathleen Jamie FRSL  (born 13 May 1962) is a Scottish poet and essayist. In 2021 she became Scotland's fourth Makar.

Life and work
Kathleen Jamie is a poet and essayist. Raised in Currie, near Edinburgh, she studied philosophy at the University of Edinburgh, publishing her first poems as an undergraduate. Her writing is rooted in Scottish landscape and culture, and ranges through travel, women's issues, archaeology and visual art. She writes in English and occasionally in Scots.

Jamie's collections include The Queen of Sheba (1995). Her 2004 collection The Tree House revealed an increasing interest in the natural world. This book won the Forward Poetry Prize and the Scottish Book of the Year Award. The Overhaul was published in September 2012. It won the 2012 Costa poetry award. For the last decade Jamie has also written non-fiction. Her collections of essays Findings and Sightlines are considered influential works of nature and landscape writing. On publication in the United States, the latter won the John Burroughs Medal and the Orion Book Award. Jamie writes occasional essays and reviews for the London Review of Books and The Guardian.

A poem by Jamie is inscribed on the national monument at Bannockburn.

In 2014, Jamie set herself the task of writing one poem per week. The resulting poems were collected in The Bonniest Companie, released in 2015, winning 2016 Saltire Society book of the year award.

In 2009 Jamie was elected as a Fellow of the Royal Society of Literature, and in 2018 elected as a Fellow of the Royal Society of Edinburgh.

In August 2021 Jamie was appointed as the fourth holder of the title of Scots Makar.

Awards
 1981 Eric Gregory Award
 1995 Somerset Maugham Award for The Queen of Sheba
 2000 Geoffrey Faber Memorial Prize for Jizzen
 2001 Scottish Arts Council Creative Scotland Award
 2003 Griffin Poetry Prize (Canada) (shortlist) for Mr. and Mrs. Scotland are Dead: Poems 1980–1994
 2004 Forward Poetry Prize (Best Poetry Collection of the Year) for The Tree House
 2005 Scottish Arts Council Book of the Year Award for The Tree House
 2012 Costa Prize Poetry Award for The Overhaul
 2014 John Burroughs Medal for Sightlines
 2014 Orion Book Award for Sightlines
 2016 Saltire Society book of the year award for The Bonniest Companie 
 2017 Ness Award "for outstanding creative writing at the confluence of travel, nature and culture"

Honours 
 2009 elected a Fellow of the Royal Society of Literature
 2018 elected a Fellow of the Royal Society of Edinburgh
 2021 appointed as Scots Makar

Bibliography 
 Black Spiders 1982
 A Flame in Your Heart (with Andrew Greig) 1986
 The Way We Live 1987
 The Golden Peak: Travels in North Pakistan 1992 (reissued as Among Muslims in 2002)
 The Autonomous Region: Poems and Photographs from Tibet 1993
 The Queen of Sheba 1994
 Jizzen 1999
 Mr & Mrs Scotland Are Dead (Poems 1980–94) 2002 (shortlisted for the 2003 International Griffin Poetry Prize)
 The Treehouse 2004 (winner of the Forward Poetry Prize) and Scottish Book of the Year Award.
 Findings 2005, essays
 Sightlines 2012, essays 
 The Overhaul (September 2012)
 The Bonniest Companie (2015)
 Surfacing (2019), essays
Contributor to A New Divan: A Lyrical Dialogue Between East and West, Gingko Library, 2019. 
Editor: Antlers of Water: Writing on the Nature and Environment of Scotland  (2020)

References

External links
 Griffin Poetry Prize biography
 Griffin Poetry Prize reading, including video clip
 Anatomy of a natural poet by Sarah Jones in Scotsman.com
 Poetry Archive profile, including audio clips

1962 births
Living people
Writers from Edinburgh
Scottish women poets
Alumni of the University of Edinburgh
Scottish scholars and academics
Academics of the University of St Andrews
Fellows of the Royal Society of Literature
Costa Book Award winners
Fellows of the Royal Society of Edinburgh
Scottish women writers